Douglas Keith Anguish (born 8 July 1950) was a Canadian politician, consultant and political assistant. He served as a New Democratic Party member of the House of Commons of Canada.

He was elected at The Battlefords—Meadow Lake electoral district in the 1980 federal election and served in the 32nd Canadian Parliament. He left politics following the 1984 federal election in which he was defeated by John Kenneth Gormley of the Progressive Conservative party.

In the 1986 Saskatchewan provincial election, Anguish won the North Battleford riding for the provincial NDP. He was re-elected there in 1991 when the NDP's Roy Romanow became premier. Anguish was re-elected in 1995, then resigned from provincial politics and his cabinet position on 1 July 1996 to seek other work.

References

External links
 

1950 births
Living people
Members of the Executive Council of Saskatchewan
Members of the House of Commons of Canada from Saskatchewan
New Democratic Party MPs
People from Meadow Lake, Saskatchewan
Saskatchewan New Democratic Party MLAs